Staffan Tunis (born December 5, 1982) in Vörå is a Finnish ski-orienteering competitor. He received a silver medal in the middle distance and a bronze medal in the sprint at the 2007 World Ski Orienteering Championships. He finished 5th with the Finnish relay team (Jukka Lanki, Matti Keskinarkaus and Tunis) at the 2007 world championships.

Tunis finished third in the overall World Cup in Ski Orienteering in 2006.

See also
 Finnish orienteers
 List of orienteers
 List of orienteering events

References

External links
 

Finnish orienteers
Male orienteers
Ski-orienteers
1982 births
Living people
Swedish-speaking Finns